Agnieszka Antonina Suchora (born 10 January 1968) is a Polish actress. Her film credits include Silent Night and My Name Is Ki. Her television work includes Sama słodycz and Plebania.

In 2018, Surchora won a Best Supporting Actress Polish Film Award for her work in Silent Night.

Suchora was married to actor Krzysztof Kowalewski until his death, in 2021.

Selected filmography

Film

Television

References

External links
 

Living people
Polish film actresses
Polish television actresses
1968 births
Polish stage actresses
People from Lublin
Polish cabaret performers
Aleksander Zelwerowicz National Academy of Dramatic Art in Warsaw alumni